60S ribosomal protein L9 is a protein that in humans is encoded by the RPL9 gene.

Ribosomes, the organelles that catalyze protein synthesis, consist of a small 40S subunit and a large 60S subunit. Together these subunits are composed of 4 RNA species and approximately 80 structurally distinct proteins. This gene encodes a ribosomal protein that is a component of the 60S subunit. The protein belongs to the L6P family of ribosomal proteins. It is located in the cytoplasm. As is typical for genes encoding ribosomal proteins, there are multiple processed pseudogenes of this gene dispersed through the genome. Two alternatively spliced transcript variants encoding the same protein have been found for this gene.

References

Further reading

External links 
 PDBe-KB provides an overview of all the structure information available in the PDB for Human 60S ribosomal protein L9

Ribosomal proteins